Pasko or Paško (Macedonian: Паско; Russian or Ukrainian: Пасько) is a Slavic name, often evolved into modern adaptations due to 18th and 19th century migration such as “Pascoe” and “Paskoe” that may refer to the following people:
Given name, nickname or patronymic 
Antun Paško Kazali (1815–1894), Croatian folk-writer, poet and translator
Pasko Kuzman (born 1947), Macedonian archaeologist
Pasko Rakic, Yugoslav-born American neuroscientist

Surname
Aleksey Pasko (1916–1997), Soviet soldier
Artyom Pasko (born 1992), Russian football player
Dhimitër Pasko (1907–1967), Albanian writer and translator
Evdokia Pasko (1919–2017), Soviet military pilot
Gennady Pasko (born 1940), Russian impressionist painter
Grigory Pasko (born 1962), Russian journalist and former Russian Navy officer 
Martin Pasko (born 1954), Canadian writer and media editor 
Paolo Pasko (born 1969), Italian singer-songwriter and musician

See also
 

Ukrainian-language surnames